Sergio Otoniel Contreras Navia (27 April 1926 – 5 January 2019) was a Chilean Catholic bishop.

Early life 
Contreras Navia was born in Chile and was ordained to the priesthood in 1957. He served as bishop of the Diocese of San Carlos de Ancud, Chile,  from 1966 to 1974 and as auxiliary bishop of the Roman Catholic Archdiocese of Concepción, Chile. He served as bishop of the Roman Catholic Diocese of Temuco, Chile from 1977 to 2001.

Notes

1926 births
2019 deaths
20th-century Roman Catholic bishops in Chile
Roman Catholic bishops of Temuco
Roman Catholic bishops of San Carlos de Ancud